In the Late Bright is an album by Tommy Keene, released in 2009.

Critical reception
The New Yorker called the album "another strong collection of power-pop compositions anchored by Keene's buzzing, insistent guitar." Paste wrote that "the weakness is that [Keene's] voice, hoarse and quite deliberate, tamps down the exuberance of his upbeat tracks, even when cushioned by harmony singing." The Oklahoman called the album "alt-pop near-perfection."

Track listing
All songs written by Tommy Keene.
"Late Bright" – 2:16
"A Secret Life of Stories" – 3:52
"Save This Harmony" – 4:04
"Tomorrow's Gone Tonight" – 3:06
"Goodbye Jane" – 2:06
"Nightmare Crime Scene" – 4:44
"Elevated" – 4:55
"Realize Your Mind" – 2:52
"The Right Time to Fly" – 2:58
"Please Don't Come Around" – 3:36
"Hide Your Eyes" – 4:16

Personnel
Tommy Keene — Vocals, Guitars, Bass, keyboards
R. Walt Vincent — keys tracks 3,5 and 6, loops and bass track 3, vocals track 6
Brad Quinn — Bass track 4, vocals track 2, 8 and 9
John Richardson — Drums

Production
Recorded by Tommy Keene, R. Walt Vincent and Jonathan Pines

Tracks 1,2,8,9,10 mixed by Jonathan Pines at Private Studios, Urbana, IL
Tracks 3,4,5,6,11 mixed by R. Walt Vincent at Mesmer, Culver City, CA
Track 7 mixed by Tommy at home

Executive Producer - Keven Lane Keller
Tracks 3 and 6 co-produced by R. Walt Vincent

Mastered by Louie Teran at Marcussen Mastering, Hollywood, CA
Art By Jim Horan

Cover photos by Chris Rady, inside live photo by Burcu Uzer, all others by Tommy Keene

References

2009 albums
Tommy Keene albums